William Benner Enright (July 12, 1925 – March 7, 2020) was a Senior United States district judge of the United States District Court for the Southern District of California.

Education and career

Born on July 12, 1925, in New York City, New York, Enright was in the United States Navy Reserve during World War II, from 1943 to 1946. He was a United States Navy Reserve, JAG Corps from 1947 to 1962. He received an Artium Baccalaureus degree from Dartmouth College in 1947 and a Bachelor of Laws from Loyola Law School in Los Angeles, California in 1950. He was a deputy district attorney of San Diego County, California from 1951 to 1954. He was in private practice in San Diego, California from 1954 to 1972.

Federal judicial service

On June 13, 1972, Enright was nominated by President Richard Nixon to a seat on the United States District Court for the Southern District of California vacated by Judge John Clifford Wallace. Enright was confirmed by the United States Senate on June 28, 1972, and received his commission on June 30, 1972. He assumed senior status on July 12, 1990. Enright died on March 7, 2020, aged 94.

See also
 List of United States federal judges by longevity of service

References

Sources
 

1925 births
2020 deaths
Lawyers from New York City
Military personnel from New York City
Judges of the United States District Court for the Southern District of California
United States district court judges appointed by Richard Nixon
20th-century American judges
United States Navy reservists
United States Navy personnel of World War II
United States Navy Judge Advocate General's Corps